ICA Gruppen AB (publ) ("ICA Group"; from Inköpscentralernas aktiebolag) (formerly Hakon Invest AB) is a Swedish retailer franchise with a focus on food and health. The group also owns a bank, real estate division and a pharmacy chain.

The company was started in 1938, based on a business model which was introduced by Hakonbolagen in 1917. Most of its operations are based in Scandinavia, and the company is the second largest retail company in the Nordic countries.

The company was owned by the participating retailers until 2000 when half of the company was sold to the Dutch retailer Ahold. It acquired a further 10% in 2004. Ahold is prevented by contractual obligation from exercising majority control over ICA. In 2013 Ahold sold its shares to Hakon for $3.1bn. In 2019, Hemtex was sold to Norwegian home textile chain Kid ASA.

Sweden

In Sweden, ICA Sverige AB operates about 1,400 retail stores as of 2020. The stores have different profiles, depending on location, range of products and size:
ICA Nära ("ICA Nearby") — Convenience-type stores for daily retail needs.
ICA Supermarket — Mid-size supermarkets, located near where customers dwell or work or near major roads, carrying a wide range of products.
ICA Kvantum — Superstores for large, planned purchases. Large spaces allocated for traffic and parking. Typically located outside of the cities.
MAXI ICA Stormarknad — Hypermarkets with a full range of groceries as well as fashions, homewares, entertainment and consumer electronics. Smaller stores do not offer the fashion and electronics ranges, while the largest stores also have a DIY and gardening department.

Each store is owned and operated separately, but operations are coordinated within the group. All feature ICA brand products.

During 2009, ICA Sverige AB had sales of 59 billion SEK (excluding VAT). A major ICA location is in Västerås, where they have a logistics center.

Since December 2001, ICA has run a series of television commercials featuring the staff and customers of a fictional ICA store. As of Mid January 2015 512 commercials have aired. Since 2007 it is listed at the Guinness World Records as the longest running television advertising drama.

In 2021, ICA opened its first automated online groceries warehouse in Brunna, outside Stockholm, to deliver grocery shops to customers. The warehouse uses technology powered by Ocado Group.

ICA meat repackaging controversy

In December 2007, a meat repackaging fraud scheme was revealed when a whistleblower spoke to Sveriges Television's flagship investigative programme Uppdrag granskning. Hans Hallén, a former quality control manager for the supermarket chain, revealed that the company was aware that meat was being illegally repackaged as early as 2003. Hallén, who monitored ICA stores in southern Sweden 2003–2005, said he informed the company's managers of the practices. According to Hallén, many stores engaged in practices such as repackaging meat to change the expiry date.

ICA Offers 
ICA Sweden's industries have a large number of stores in which and each is offered weekly offers that provide opportunities for customers to buy cheaper goods online or in physical stores. Each can also offer some extra specific items in the store, depending on their own policy.

Apotek Hjärtat 
ICA Gruppen owns the pharmacy shop chain Apotek Hjärtat, which ICA purchased in 2014. Apotek Hjärtat has 390 shops in Sweden.

Norway
ICA Norge AS runs about 600 stores in Norway as of 2009. Store sales were at approximately 21 billion SEK (excluding VAT). Formerly known as Hakongruppen and owned by Stein Erik Hagen, it operated solely RIMI discount stores until ICA bought the chain, and transformed many of the stores to the ICA brand. After the take-over ICA has been losing market shares in Norway. ICA Norway is divided into four different stores:
 Matkroken
 ICA Nær (closed 2014)
 ICA Supermarked (closed 2015/2016) 
 ICA Maxi (closed 2012)
 RIMI (a chain of food stores)
In 2014 ICA stores was sold to Coop Norge. ICA Supermarked was changed to Coop Xtra and Coop Prix.

Rimi Baltic 
ICA's wholly owned subsidiary Rimi Baltic operates discount stores, supermarkets and hypermarkets across Estonia, Latvia and Lithuania.

In 2010, Rimi Baltic's net sales were 10,352 million SEK.

ICA Bank

ICA Bank operates in Sweden and has agency agreements with nearly all ICA stores in the country. The basic idea is to offer banking services that build loyalty among ICA's customers, as well as to increase the share of store transactions executed with ICA's own cards instead of more expensive cards from other banks. Sales amounted to  612 MSEK in 2010.

ICA Real Estate
ICA Real Estate's mission is to satisfy the Group's need for the right properties in the right locations in Sweden and Norway. This is currently done by owning, renting and strategically developing marketplaces. The Group currently owns around 180 store properties.

History

Statoil
Until the mid-1990s, Statoil and ICA jointly operated Statoil Detaljhandel AB (Statoil Retail Ltd) which ran approximately 1,300 petrol stations in Scandinavia, many branded under the name ICA Express. ICA has since sold its 50 percent share of the business back to Statoil and the ICA name was removed from the petrol stations during 2007.

Denmark
ICA previously had a 50 percent stake in the ISO chain of supermarkets in the Copenhagen region, Denmark. In 2004, ICA sold its entire holding in ISO.

Netto Sweden
The Swedish operation of Danish supermarket chain Netto was founded in 2002 as a joint venture between Dansk Supermarked and ICA. The joint venture was named Netto Marknad AB.  At the end of 2006, ICA announced it was pulling out of the joint venture, reducing its stake from 50 to 5 percent. Twenty-one of the Netto stores in the Stockholm and Västmanland regions were transferred to ICA's ownership and rebranded to ICA's own formats or closed during 2007.

References

External links
  

Supermarkets of Sweden
Companies based in Solna Municipality
Swedish companies established in 1938
Retail companies established in 1938
Companies listed on Nasdaq Stockholm

sv:Ica Gruppen